The Tanzania women's national handball team is the national team of Tanzania. It is governed by the Tanzania Amateur Handball Association  and takes part in international handball competitions.

African Championship record
2004 – 8th

External links
IHF profile

Women's national handball teams
Handball
National team